The Aquaria KLCC is an oceanarium located beneath Kuala Lumpur Convention Centre within Kuala Lumpur City Centre in Kuala Lumpur, Malaysia.

History
Construction for Aquaria KLCC started in 2003. It was officially opened in August 2005.

Features
Featuring  in two levels with a  underwater tunnel, Aquaria KLCC houses over 250 different species and over 5,000 land and aquatic animals from Malaysia and around the world. Interactive information kiosks on fish and turtle conservation.
Aquaria KLCC is based on the journey of water from the land to the sea. The journey starts in the misty highlands, down through rivers, through the rainforest and mangroves to the coral reefs into the deep blue sea. There is a large food-court just outside the aquarium with many choices of food.

The Aquaria is located in the lower levels of the Kuala Lumpur Convention Centre. 

At the end of the Aquaria, visitors will pass by an exquisite souvenir shop and then you will also find a food court at the exit.

See also
 Kuala Lumpur Convention Centre
List of tourist attractions in Malaysia

References

External links

 
 
 Aquaria KLCC
 Aquaria KLCC on TripAdvisor

2005 establishments in Malaysia
Aquaria in Malaysia
Tourist attractions in Kuala Lumpur